Following is a list of justices of the Nebraska Supreme Court:

Territorial Supreme Court justices

State Supreme Court chief justices

All State Supreme Court justices

Information Gathered from Slipping Backward: A History of the Nebraska Supreme Court, the Nebraska Blue Book, and History of Nebraska By Morton & Watkins

References

External links

Nebraska
Justices